Matthew William Brennan (October 3, 1897 – January 3, 1963) was an American football back who played two seasons in the National Football League with the New York Giants and Brooklyn Lions. He first enrolled at Villanova University before transferring to Fordham University and lastly Lafayette College.

References

External links
Just Sports Stats

1897 births
1963 deaths
Players of American football from Connecticut
American football running backs
Villanova Wildcats football players
Fordham Rams football players
Lafayette Leopards football players
New York Giants players
Brooklyn Lions players
Sportspeople from Stamford, Connecticut